The 2018–19 FIS Cross-Country Far East Cup was a season of the Far East Cup, a Continental Cup season in cross-country skiing for men and women. The season began on 16 December 2018 in Alpensia, Pyeongchang, South Korea and concluded on 3 March 2019 in Shiramine, Japan.

Calendar

Men

Women

Overall standings

Men's overall standings

Women's overall standings

References

External links
2019 Overall Standings Men
2019 Overall Standings Women

Far East Cup
FIS Cross-Country Far East Cup seasons
2018 in cross-country skiing
2019 in cross-country skiing